Martin Lamm (22 June 1880 – 5 May 1950) was a Swedish literary scholar.

Lamm was the son of businessman Herman Lamm and Lisen Philipson. He became associate professor of literature at Uppsala University in 1908. Lamm was professor at Stockholm University 1919–1945. In 1928, he became a member of the Swedish Academy. Lamm was the first scholar to systematically edit the unpublished papers of August Strindberg and to conduct serious studies on the works of Carl Jonas Love Almquist. He also wrote a biography on Emanuel Swedenborg. Lamm died in a tram accident on Skeppsbron in Stockholm.

Sources
 Svenska Dagbladets årsbok : 1950, ed. Erik Rudberg, Edvin Hellbom, Stockholm 1951 p. 286.
 Lamm 5, Herman Fredrik in Nordisk familjebok (2nd ed., 1911).

1880 births
1950 deaths
Academic staff of Uppsala University
Members of the Swedish Academy